Line 6 of the Shenyang Metro is a rapid transit line running from north to south Shenyang. It is the seventh line of the Shenyang Metro to start construction and expected to open in 2026.

History
Construction started on 26 December 2020.

Stations (north to south)

References

06